ACOA or Acoa may refer to:

 Acoa, a historic country house in Habersham County, Georgia, United States
 Adult Children of Alcoholics, an American organization
 Ant colony optimization algorithms, probabilistic techniques for solving computational problems that can be reduced to finding good paths through graphs
 Atlantic Canada Opportunities Agency, the Canadian federal government agency responsible for helping to develop economic capacity in the Atlantic Provinces